Aaron Frazier (born July 21, 1979) is an American actor who is best known for playing Old Weird Harold in the 2004 film Fat Albert. Frazier was born in Chicago, Illinois. Frazier grew up in Chicago and later moved to East Compton, California.

Aaron Frazier can currently be seen on the HBO series BALLERS as the character Cliff.

Filmography

External links

1979 births
Living people
American male film actors